Alfonso Piccin (4 September 1901 – 8 September 1932) was an Italian racing cyclist. He rode in the 1925 Tour de France.

References

External links
 

1901 births
1932 deaths
Italian male cyclists
Place of birth missing
Cyclists from the Province of Treviso